"Capua" ptilocrossa is a species of moth of the family Tortricidae. It is found in Malawi.

Taxonomy
The species does not belong in the genus Capua and should be placed in a new genus.

References

Endemic fauna of Malawi
Moths described in 1914
Archipini
Taxa named by Alexey Diakonoff